Daniel Ribeiro was born in São Paulo on May 20, 1982. He is a Brazilian film director known for his works You, Me and Him (Portuguese: Cafe com Leite) made in 2007 and I Don't Want To Go Back Alone (Portuguese: Eu Não Quero Voltar Sozinho) made in 2010 which was later made into the full-length feature The Way He Looks (Portuguese: Hoje Eu Quero Voltar Sozinho) in 2014.

In 2007 Ribeiro won an award for You, Me and Him, while the film itself has received many awards including the Crystal Bear for best short film at the 2008 Berlin International Film Festival. The film is about a man named Danilo that is getting ready to move in with his boyfriend Marcos when his parents die unexpectedly and he suddenly has custody of his 10-year-old brother Lucas.

I Don't Want To Go Back Alone is about a blind boy Leonardo and his best friend Giovana that helps guide him home. When a third friend Gabriel comes into the picture Leonardo begins to realize his feelings for him. The full-length version The Way He Looks contains more detail and changes the plot slightly, but has the same concepts as the short. In 2011 I Don't Want To Go Back Alone won the Iris Prize. The Way He Looks won two awards at the 64th Berlin International Film Festival, the FIPRESCI Prize for best feature film in the Panorama section, and the Teddy Award for best LGBT-themed feature.

Filmography
 2007 - You, Me and Him (Café com Leite)
 2010 - I Don't Want To Go Back Alone (Eu Não Quero Voltar Sozinho)
 2014 - The Way He Looks (Hoje Eu Quero Voltar Sozinho)

Awards and nominations
(All awards in 2008 for You, Me and Him)

Winner: 2008 Crystal Bear for Best Short Film at 58th Berlin International Film Festival (Berlinale) - Germany 
Winner of Best Short Film (fiction) at the Grande Prêmio do Cinema Brasileiro
Winner of "Lente de Cristal" for Best Short Film at the 12th Brazilian Film Festival of Miami - United States
Winner: "Coxiponé Trophy" for Best Director of Shorts at the 15th Festival de Cinema e Vídeo de Cuiabá - Brazil
Winner "Menina de Ouro Trophy" for Best Director of Short Films at the First Festival Paulínia de Cinema
Winner of 5 awards at the Festival de Cinema de Campina Grande for:
Best Short Film
Award: Best Short Fiction
Award: Best Director
Award: Best Screenplay
Award: Best Actor (for main lead Daniel Tavares)
Winner of Best Director - Short Films at the 6th Curta Santos
Winner of 2011 Iris Prize for 'Eu não quero voltar sozinho'
Winner of 2014 Jury's choice at Carrousel international du film de Rimouski for The Way He Looks
Other awards as a screenwriter:
Winner: Best Script for "ENTRE TODOS" at the Second Festival of Short Films of Human Rights(2008).

References

http://www.imdb.com/title/tt1166805/awards
http://www.imdb.com/name/nm2406154/awards

External links
 Official site of You, Me and Him (Café com Leite)
 
 I Don't Want To Go Back Alone - IMDB

Brazilian film directors
Brazilian screenwriters
1982 births
Living people
Writers from São Paulo
LGBT film directors
21st-century LGBT people